Neil French is a British advertising executive widely credited with bringing the creative revolution to Asia when he was associated with The Ball Partnership in Singapore. His work for Chivas Regal, Kaminomoto, and in particular the 'XO Beer' campaign for The Straits Times, is used as case studies in advertising schools around the world. French, the recipient of numerous advertising awards, has also been criticized for the creation of "scam ads."

Controversy 
He resigned from his position as a worldwide Creative Director at WPP Group PLC after allegedly making sexist comments to an audience in Toronto on 6 October 2005. He reportedly said that there weren't more female creative directors in advertising because after spending their time within the industry, they usually leave "to go suckle something." This made a few offended guests walk out, and provoked much online discussion. The most notorious of responses was that of Nancy Vonk, the Co-Chief Creative Director of Ogilvy Toronto, who wrote an online essay titled "Females Like Me", expressing her outrage at Neil's comments.

The comment that was made was “You can’t be a great creative director and have a baby and keep spending time off every time your kids are ill ... Everyone who doesn’t commit themselves fully to the job is crap at it.” As a result, the WPP Group forbade him to speak at either the Creative Circle Awards ceremony on 18 November 2005 or the AdAsia'05 conference in late November. However, he still accepted the "Champion of CCA" award at the CCA ceremony.

Notable interviews 
In 2009, the lifestyle network “AzurTV” interviewed Neil French during the Cannes Lions Festival. French mentioned to the interviewer having been a gangster and bullfighter during his youth. He then explained that his favourite job that “out of all the different jobs I had” was being a “Dad”.

In an interview in Agency.Asia Magazine in 2009, French discussed the events leading up to his leaving WWP - a role that had seen him simultaneously preside over JWT, Grey Worldwide, Ogilvy & Mather, Young & Rubicam, Bates, Red Cell, and Wunderman. The *2009 interview cited a somewhat contradictory viewpoint of French courtesy of Jureeporn Thaidumrong, awarded Hong Kong’s Media magazine 'Asia Pacific’s Creative of the Year' in 2006 and of whom the Cannes Lions International Advertising Festival 2009 organizer suggested is, ' ... generally regarded as one of the most powerful women in Asian advertising'.

Thaidumrong's appraisal of French and the Toronto controversy stemmed from her 14 January 2009 ihaveanidea.com interview and she offered this: “Contrary to what people may think and have been saying for the last couple of years, he's very supportive of woman creatives. I can guarantee that because I am actually one of the women he helped. I wouldn't stand where I am today if it wasn't for him.”

When asked by the Agency. Asia interviewer, 'Neil, you must feel vindicated that one of Asia’s most celebrated stars credited you – and only you – as her inspiration.' - French responded by saying, 'I never felt in need of vindication, actually. Don’t forget that the now-infamous occasion was fomented by a woman who had previously had an ear-bashing for being away on long leave when I visited the office. It was, palpably, a most efficient revenge … but had the film of the entire evening been made available, anyone with a sense of humour or irony would have seen the pottiness of the reaction.'

World Press Awards 
French is the founder of the new advertising award-show, "The World Press Awards', which will be limited to advertising that appears solely in the print media. The judges will be Jeremy Craigen, of DDB, Mark Tutssel of Leo Burnett, Erik Vervroegen of TBWA, Tham Khai Meng of Ogilvy, Marcello Serpa of AlmapBBDO, and Graham Warsop of The Jupiter Drawing Room. 
French has also briefly served as manager of the British Heavy metal band Judas Priest.

References

External links
Neil French personal website
ihaveanidea's interview with Neil French

A Night with Neil French event review
Brett McKenzie interviews Neil at Cannes more than 6 months after the 6 October event
2009 interview with Agency.Asia Magazine

Year of birth missing (living people)
Living people
21st-century British businesspeople
British advertising executives